Veiko Lember (born 29 November 1977) is an Estonian volleyball player.

He was born in Kuressaare. In 2002 he graduated from the University of Tartu's Faculty of Social Sciences.

He began his volleyball career in 1985, coached by his mother Marvi Lember. He has played in volleyball club Tartu Ösel Foods, Pärnu VK, Tallinna Audentes, and Tallinna Selver. 1998–2009 he was a member of Estonian national volleyball team.

2006-2016 he worked at Tallinn University of Technology.

Sporting achievements

Clubs
Baltic League
  2006/2007 - with Selver Tallinn
  2007/2008 - with Selver Tallinn
  2008/2009 - with Selver Tallinn

National championship
 1997/1998  Estonian Championship, with Ösel Foods Tartu
 1998/1999  Estonian Championship, with Ösel Foods Tartu
 1999/2000  Estonian Championship, with Pere Leib Tartu
 2000/2001  Estonian Championship, with Pere Leib Tartu
 2001/2002  Estonian Championship, with Pere Leib Tartu
 2002/2003  Estonian Championship, with Pere Leib Tartu
 2003/2004  Estonian Championship, with ESS Falck Pärnu
 2004/2005  Estonian Championship, with Audentes Tallinn
 2005/2006  Estonian Championship, with Selver Tallinn
 2006/2007  Estonian Championship, with Selver Tallinn
 2007/2008  Estonian Championship, with Selver Tallinn
 2008/2009  Estonian Championship, with Selver Tallinn

National cup
 1998/1999  Estonian Cup, with Ösel Foods Tartu
 1999/2000  Estonian Cup, with Pere Leib Tartu
 2000/2001  Estonian Cup, with Pere Leib Tartu
 2001/2002  Estonian Cup, with Pere Leib Tartu
 2002/2003  Estonian Cup, with Pere Leib Tartu
 2003/2004  Estonian Cup, with ESS Falck Pärnu
 2004/2005  Estonian Cup, with Audentes Tallinn
 2006/2007  Estonian Cup, with Selver Tallinn
 2007/2008  Estonian Cup, with Selver Tallinn
 2008/2009  Estonian Cup, with Selver Tallinn

References

Living people
1977 births
Estonian men's volleyball players
University of Tartu alumni
Sportspeople from Kuressaare